Duke Levine (born November 29, 1961) is an American guitarist, known primarily for his rock and country music playing as a session musician.

Levine was born in Worcester, Massachusetts, United States. He has recorded and performed with Shawn Colvin, Peter Wolf, Lucy Kaplansky, Bill Morrissey, Jonatha Brooke, John Gorka, David Maxwell, Dennis Brennan, Jeanie Stahl, Ellis Paul, Mary Chapin Carpenter, Slaid Cleaves and many others. From 2009 to 2011 and again from 2012 to 2015, he was the touring guitarist for The J. Geils Band and is currently playing with Bonnie Raitt. He frequently performs live with The Duke Levine Band and Slaid Cleaves.

Discography
1992: Nobody's Home
1994: Country Soul Guitar
1997: Lava
2007: Beneath the Blue
2016: The Fade Out

References

External links
Duke Levine Homepage
New England Jazz History Database

1961 births
American session musicians
Lead guitarists
Living people
Guitarists from Massachusetts
Musicians from Worcester, Massachusetts
American male guitarists
20th-century American guitarists
20th-century American male musicians